NPM may stand for:

Organizations

 National Postal Museum (since 1993), a museum in Washington, D.C., United States
 National Palace Museum, a museum in Taipei, Taiwan
 npm, Inc., a software development and hosting company based in California, United States
 NPM/CNP (Compagnie Nationale à Portefeuille SA), a Belgian non-listed holding company
 New People's Militia in Manipur, India

Technology

 npm (software), the default package manager for the JavaScript runtime environment Node.js
 Network performance management
 Nintendo Power magazine, a video game magazine

Other

 New Public Management, a management doctrine for governments
 Nils Petter Molvær (born 1960), Norwegian jazz trumpeter, also branded NPM since 2008
 Net profit margin, a measure of profitability